Comendador Levy Gasparian is a municipality located in the Brazilian state of Rio de Janeiro. Its population was 8,576 (2020) and its area is 107 km².

References

Municipalities in Rio de Janeiro (state)